E. tricolor  may refer to:
 Ecsenius tricolor, the Derawan combtooth-blenny, a fish species found in the western central Pacific Ocean, around the Philippines and Borneo
 Egretta tricolor, the tricolored heron or Louisiana heron, a bird species found from the Gulf states of the United States and northern Mexico south through Central America and the Caribbean to central Brazil and Peru
 Epipedobates tricolor, the phantasmal poison frog, a frog species found in Ecuador
 Epthianura tricolor, the crimson chat, a bird species found in Australia
 Erythrura tricolor, the tricoloured parrotfinch, a bird species found in Indonesia and East Timor

See also
 Tricolor (disambiguation)